Conus bellacoensis is an extinct species of sea snail, a marine gastropod mollusk in the family Conidae, the cone snails, cone shells or cones.

Description
The size of the shell grows to a length of 76 mm.

Distribution
This marine species is only known as a fossil from the Neogene of the Dominican Republic.

References

 Hendricks J.R. (2015). Glowing seashells: diversity of fossilized coloration patterns on coral reef-associated cone snail (Gastropoda: Conidae) shells from the Neogene of the Dominican Republic. PLoS ONE. 10(4): e0120924

External links
 To World Register of Marine Species

bellacoensis
Fossil taxa described in 2015